Metropolitan Area of Bogotá is the metropolitan area of the Colombian capital city of Bogotá, usually used for statistical analysis or technical use. It is not a formal administrative division and its limits are therefore not defined.

The study included the Capital District of Bogotá and 17 of the surrounding municipalities in the Department of Cundinamarca; Soacha, Facatativá, Zipaquirá, Chía, Mosquera, Madrid, Funza, Cajicá, Sibaté, Tocancipá, La Calera, Sopó, Tabio, Tenjo, Cota, Gachancipá and Bojacá.

Metropolitan Areas in Colombia 

Metropolitan areas in Colombia are regions legally established by an urban center and the surrounding areas. These areas must meet certain criteria including population, minimum average of total urban population, political motivation (accords between municipalities or other administrative entities). In Colombia there are only five of these metropolitan areas legally established. The Metropolitan Area of Medellin, Metropolitan Area of Bucaramanga, Metropolitan Area of Barranquilla (also having a special district), Metropolitan Area of Cúcuta and the Metropolitan Area of the Midwest (having as head the city of Pereira). The Metropolitan areas of Cali, Popayán and Bogotá are yet to be legally established, however in some cases the Colombian government recognizes these.

Metropolitan Area of the Bogotá Savanna

This possible definition of the Metropolitan Area for Bogotá would include the Capital District with its 20 localities adding the municipalities of Soacha, Mosquera, Funza, Madrid, Chía, Cajicá, Cota, La Calera, Tenjo, Tabio, Sibaté, Zipaquirá and Facatativá (In the 2005 Census, DANE also additioned Bojacá, Gachancipá, Tocancipá and Sopó). These possible definitions for a metropolitan area of Bogotá has not been established due to the resistance of these municipalities to lose autonomy.

Population by municipality (2019 census)

Soacha and Sibaté
Soacha is the only municipality in which the urban area has conurbated with Bogotá, specifically with the localities of Bosa and Ciudad Bolívar. Sibaté conurbated with the municipality of Soacha integrating it also to Bogota.

Municipalities partially integrated 
The urban perimeter of Bogotá extends to the Bogotá River where it limits with the municipalities of Mosquera, Funza and Cota. In this area there is an ongoing urban development, mostly industrial, that will eventually conurbate with Bogotá, the same applies to the municipality of La Calera. The urban areas of the municipalities of Cota and Chía are already intersecting with the Capital District. Chia and Cajicá's urban areas are also conurbated.

Commuter towns 
The possible Metropolitan Area of the Bogotá Savanna would include the three main urban concentrations Bogotá, Facatativá and Zipaquirá, the last two growing as economic and industrial hubs. Among the towns that would become Commuter towns for the City of Bogotá are Mosquera, Funza, Madrid, Chía, Cajicá, Cota, La Calera, Tenjo, Tabio, Sibaté, Zipaquirá and Facatativá. As urban centers Facatativá would serve also as working center for Madrid, El Rosal and Subachoque. Zipaquirá by the towns of Chía, Cajicá, Tabio, Tenjo and Sopó, among others.

References

External links 
 University of Warsaw - Territorial Ordinance Plan; Metropolitan Area of Bogota

 
Geography of Bogotá
Metropolitan areas of Colombia